The 1954–55 Scottish Division A was won by Aberdeen by three points over nearest rival Celtic. No teams were relegated due to the league being expanded the following season.

League table

Results

References 

 Statto.com

1954–55 Scottish Football League
Scottish Division One seasons
Scot